Raed Fedaa (Arabic:رائد الفادع; born 20 May 1997) is a Tunisian professional footballer who plays as a defender for Espérance de Tunis.

References

External links
 

1997 births
Living people
Association football defenders
Tunisian footballers
Espérance Sportive de Tunis players
ES Zarzis players
Tunisian Ligue Professionnelle 1 players